Lesia Tsurenko was the two-time defending champion, but chose not to defend her title.

Wang Yafan won her first WTA singles title, defeating Sofia Kenin in the final, 2–6, 6–3, 7–5.

Seeds

Draw

Finals

Top half

Bottom half

Qualifying

Seeds

Qualifiers

Lucky loser
  Martina Trevisan

Draw

First qualifier

Second qualifier

Third qualifier

Fourth qualifier

Fifth qualifier

Sixth qualifier

References

External links
 Main draw
 Qualifying draw

Womb
Abierto Mexicano Telcel - Women's Singles